The 1956 Vanderbilt Commodores football team represented Vanderbilt University during the 1956 NCAA University Division football season.

Schedule

References

Vanderbilt
Vanderbilt Commodores football seasons
Vanderbilt Commodores football